Tara Perry (born 20 November 1974) is a Canadian sprinter. She competed in the women's 200 metres at the 1996 Summer Olympics.

References

External links
 

1974 births
Living people
Athletes (track and field) at the 1996 Summer Olympics
Athletes (track and field) at the 2000 Summer Olympics
Canadian female sprinters
Olympic track and field athletes of Canada
Athletes (track and field) at the 1999 Pan American Games
Pan American Games track and field athletes for Canada
Athletes (track and field) at the 1998 Commonwealth Games
Commonwealth Games competitors for Canada
Sportspeople from New Westminster
Olympic female sprinters
Universiade medalists in athletics (track and field)
Universiade bronze medalists for Canada
20th-century Canadian women
21st-century Canadian women